Ebrahim Victory (born  in Tehran, Iran) attended the Kourosh Primary School and the Firooz Bahram High School in Iran. He came to the United States in 1952, and after one year of studying English at Wesley Junior College in Dover, Delaware, he attended M.I.T. from 1953 to 1958, where he received the degrees of Bachelor of Science, and Master of Science in Mechanical Engineering with specialties in textiles technology and aerodynamics. During the years 1957–1958, he also taught a course on textiles technology at the graduate school of M.I.T., and performed research on a project for the U.S. Air Force designing a wind tunnel for testing parachute fabrics.

From 1958 to 1975 he participated in research projects involving the effects of nuclear weapons for the U.S. Air Force, silent propulsion systems for the U.S. Navy and combustion instability in rockets for NASA. He also worked for Johnson and Johnson and other American industrial companies in product development. From 1977 to 1978, he worked as a consultant to the Agriculture Ministry in Iran.

Upon his return from Iran, he established his own company developing custom made computer programs for medium-sized companies.

He is well known to the Iranian community in the United States through his interviews in various radio programs; for the past twelve years he has been appearing on various Persian radio and TV programs speaking on subjects relating to space exploration, astronomy, and cosmology.  Since September 2002, he has been writing and hosting a weekly two-hour TV program called "The Wonders of the Universe," which has appeared on Channel One and Andisheh TV. He has a program on Channel One TV now.

He is the author of some 50 scientific articles on the results of his research, as well as well over 500 popular science articles on space, astronomy, and cosmology for various Persian language magazines and publications.

His four books entitled The Wonders Of The Universe,  The Mysteries Of The Universe, Part One and Two and God, Religion and Science are a collection of some 60 of his comprehensive articles in both English and Persian along with over 100 high-quality color photographs of space and related illustrations.

His book named God, Religion and Science is a different book in comparison with his previous three books. More fundamental topics and comparison of the "God introduced by the religions" and the "Scientific God" are what distinguish this book from the previous books.

His last book entitled Cosmic Phenomenon. This book aims to separate fact from fiction.

Membership  
Current Membership
Fellow of the Society of Sigma Xi
Past Membership
American Rocket Society
American Institute of Aeronautics and Astronautics
American Astronautical Society
American Physical Society
Explorers Society

Cosmology and Astronomy Quizzes and Awards 

Ebrahim Victory had live TV quizzes every weekend in the year 2008 Called "Red Chair". He awarded Golden Coins to the people who could answer scientific questions about cosmology, astronomy and Nasa history. ,Mehdi Ramazani, writer of the book Attraction in Love, won that golden coin twice by answering questions about dark energy, the solar system and NASA astronauts. He was 18 that time.

Bibliography  
 Jun-2002 . The Wonders of the Universe
 Sep-2005 . The Mysteries of the Universe Part One
 Feb-2007 . The Mysteries of the Universe Part Two
 Oct-2008 . God, Religion And Science
 Oct-2009 . Cosmic Phenomenon

References  
 Victory's Biography
 Interviews in Channel One TV

External links 
 Official website of Ebrahim Victory

1933 births
Iranian emigrants to the United States
Iranian engineers
MIT School of Engineering alumni
Living people
Science communicators